Ana Konjuh was the defending champion, but after having won the 2013 US Open – Girls' singles, she announced she would no longer take part on the junior tour. Konjuh competed in the women's singles competition as a qualifier, but she lost to eventual champion Li Na in the first round.

Elizaveta Kulichkova won the tournament, defeating Jana Fett in the final, 6–2, 6–1.

Seeds

Main draw

Finals

Top half

Section 1

Section 2

Bottom half

Section 3

Section 4

References

External links 
 Main draw

Girls' Singles
Australian Open, 2014 Girls' Singles